Yahya ibn Sa'd is one of the more prominent Tabi'een.

He has narrated the Hadith of the door to knowledge.

References

Taba‘ at-Tabi‘in hadith narrators